Khubz, alternatively transliterated as khoubz, khobez, khubez, or khubooz, is the usual word for "bread" in Standard Arabic and in many of the vernaculars.

Among the breads popular in Middle Eastern countries are "pocket" pita bread in the Levant and Egypt, and the flat tannur bread in Iraq.

The oldest known find of bread, by archaeologists in Northern Jordan, dates back 14,000 years. It was a sort of unleavened flatbread made with several types of wild cereals.

Tannur bread 

In Iraq, the most popular bread is the Tannur bread (خبز التنور‎) which resembles other slightly leavened flatbreads such as Iranian nan-e barbari, Central and South Asian flatbreads (such as naan), and pizza base. (See also tandoor bread and taboon bread.)

The word tannur comes from the Akkadian word , which consists of the parts  'mud' and  'fire' and is mentioned as early as in the Akkadian Epic of Gilgamesh.

Six recipes for bread baked in a tannur are included in Ibn Sayyar al-Warraq's 10th century Kitab al-Tabikh cookery book.

As a result of the economic sanctions imposed on Iraq in the 1990s there was an increase in the making of bread in the traditional way in a tannur.

Pita bread 

Pita is a flatbread found in many Mediterranean, Balkan, and Middle Eastern cuisines. It is thin and puffs up as it bakes. Since it does not contain any added fat, it dries out rapidly and is best consumed while still warm; later, it may become chewy.

The "pocket" pita originated in the Middle East. It is also known as Arab(ic) bread, Lebanese bread, or Syrian bread.

In Egyptian, Palestinian, Jordanian, Lebanese,  and Syrian cuisine, almost every savory dish can be eaten in or on pita bread. It is one of the staple food items in the Lebanese cuisine. Common fillings include falafel, lamb or chicken shawarma, kebab, omelettes such as shakshouka (eggs and tomatoes), hummus, and other mezes.

Nationals of other countries, for example, South Asians, also consume it as a replacement for roti with curries, cooked vegetables or meat (dry or gravy).

See also 

 Msemen
 Baghrir
 Lafa
 Pita
 Arab cuisine

References

Arab cuisine
Flatbreads
Iraqi cuisine
Israeli cuisine
Jewish breads
Jordanian cuisine
Lebanese cuisine
Levantine cuisine
Middle Eastern cuisine
Moroccan cuisine
Palestinian cuisine
Syrian cuisine
Yemeni cuisine
Maghrebi cuisine